WELL-LD is a low-power, evangelical Christian television station in Philadelphia, Pennsylvania. It broadcasts locally in digital on UHF channel 29 as a Daystar owned-and-operated station.

History
The station began as a construction permit issued November 30, 1988 to Charles W. Loughery to build a low-power television station on VHF channel 8, callsign W08CR, to serve Warminster, Pennsylvania. After several extensions of the construction permit, the FCC licensed the station on March 5, 1992. In 1997, Loughery got authorization to move the transmitter and to change the cities of license to Willow Grove and Cheltenham; at the same time, he arranged to sell the station to RJ Broadcasting Company. The sale was completed in September 1997, and the new owners completed the transmitter move and changed the station's call letters to WELL-LP. In October 2000, RJ Broadcasting sold the station to Daystar Television Network, who upgraded the license to Class A and changed the callsign to WELL-CA. Daystar received permission to move the station to UHF channel 15, however, the new channel location created interference to New York City land mobile operations on channel 15, which WELL-CA was not able to resolve. WELL-CA has been forced to apply to move to UHF channel 45, but in the meantime, moved back to channel 8. In October 2006, Daystar changed the license back to non-Class A low-power and changed the station's callsign back to WELL-LP.

On February 18, 2010 Daystar launched a digital signal at the same location of WELL-LP's current facility under the call sign WELL-LD on UHF channel 30, with its city of license moved to Philadelphia; the analog signal on channel 8 closed soon afterward.

Digital channel

References

External links

DayStar website
RabbitEars.Info -- Digital TV Market Listing for Facility ID 167028 (WELL-LD) - Philadelphia, Pennsylvania
RabbitEars.Info -- Station Information for Facility ID 167028 (WELL-LD)

ELL-LD
Religious television stations in the United States
Daystar (TV network) affiliates
Television channels and stations established in 1988
Low-power television stations in the United States